HD 217786 is a binary star system in the equatorial constellation of Pisces. With an apparent visual magnitude of 7.78, it requires binoculars or a small telescope to view. Kinematically, the star system belongs to the thin disk population of the Milky Way. 

The primary is an F-type main-sequence star with a stellar classification of F8V. It is much older than Sun with an estimated age of 9.4 billion years and is spinning slowly with a projected rotational velocity of 1.2 km/s. The star has a lower proportion of heavy elements than the Sun, having 65% of solar abundance. It has about the same mass as the Sun but a 32% larger radius. The star is radiating nearly double the luminosity of the Sun from its photosphere at an effective temperature of 5,882 K. 

A low-mass stellar companion at a projected separation of 155 AU was discovered in 2016. The proper motion of this co-moving object suggests it is gravitationally-bound to the primary, and their orbit is being viewed edge-on. If the orbit is assumed to be circular, then the orbital period for the pair is ~6.2 Myr. No other companion stars have been detected at separations from 2.74 to 76.80 AUs.

The star system exhibits strong stellar flare activity in the ultraviolet.

Planetary system
In 2010 one superjovian planet or brown dwarf on an eccentric orbit was discovered utilising the radial velocity method. Designated component Ab, the high eccentricity of this object may have been caused by interaction with the secondary star. In 2022, the inclination and true mass of HD 217786 Ab were measured via astrometry, and a second planet was discovered orbiting closer to the star.

References

F-type main-sequence stars
Multi-star planetary systems
Planetary systems with one confirmed planet
Brown dwarfs
Pisces (constellation)
J23030822-0025465
Durchmusterung objects
217786
113834